The 1987 Can-Am Teams season was the twentieth and final running of the Sports Car Club of America's Can Am Series and the eleventh and final running of the revived series. For 1987, the series added March 85Cs from CART, although some continued to use the old prototypes. Bill Tempero was declared champion. The Marches acted as a "single seat Can Am" group, replacing the old Formula 5000 cars.

Schedule

References

Can
Can-Am seasons